Castle Minerva is a 1954 spy thriller novel by the British writer Victor Canning. It was published in the United States under the alternative title of A Handful of Silver. A contemporary review in The Sunday Times concluded "Castle Minerva not only brilliantly entertains; it satisfies".

Synopsis
While taking a climbing holiday in North Wales, David Fraser encounters his old wartime comrade Colonel Drexel. Drexel wants him to go to Southern France for him to protect a young Arab prince whose country has valuable oil reserves and will sign a treaty once he comes of age. However only a few days after arriving in Banyuls-sur-Mer in the Pyrenees, the prince goes missing and Fraser is blamed.

Film adaptation
It was adapted into the British film Masquerade directed by Basil Dearden and starring Cliff Robertson, Jack Hawkins and Marisa Mell.

References

Bibliography
 Goble, Alan. The Complete Index to Literary Sources in Film. Walter de Gruyter, 1999.
 Reilly, John M. Twentieth Century Crime & Mystery Writers. Springer, 2015.

1954 British novels
British thriller novels
British spy novels
British novels adapted into films
Novels by Victor Canning
Novels set in Wales
Novels set in France
Hodder & Stoughton books